The Liar is a fantasy novella by American writer John P. Murphy. It was first published in  The Magazine of Fantasy and Science Fiction in March 2016.

Synopsis
Greg is a "Liar", who has the power to "convince" reality that what he says is true — which does not make it easier for him to investigate a string of mysterious deaths going back decades.

Reception

"The Liar" was a finalist for the Nebula Award for Best Novella of 2016. Tangent Online commended Murphy for creating "interesting characters steeped in a sense of place", while Jason Sanford included it on  his recommended reading list for 2016.

References

Fantasy short stories
Works originally published in The Magazine of Fantasy & Science Fiction